Volker Hadwich (born 23 September 1964) is a German male former javelin thrower who competed for East Germany and Germany. Born in Magdeburg, during his career he competed for his hometown club SC Magdeburg and stood at 1.96 m, weighing 103 kg.

He had his first international success at the 1987 Universiade, where he was the bronze medallist behind Marek Kaleta and Sejad Krdžalic.

The 1989 season was the peak of his career. He was the bronze medallist at both the 1989 European Cup and 1989 IAAF World Cup, with Steve Backley being the winner at both events.

After missing much of the 1990 and 1991 seasons due to injury, he returned to claim the second and final national title of his career at the German Athletics Championships, throwing  (his best that year). As a result he was chosen to represent Germany at the 1992 Summer Olympics.

Later investigation of leaked Stasi files showed Hadwich had failed doping tests for abnormal levels of testosterone, which were subsequently covered up by the national sports body.

International competitions

National titles
East German Athletics Championships
Javelin throw: 1989
German Athletics Championships
Javelin throw: 1992

Seasonal progression
1986: 81.02 m
1987: 80.74 m
1988: 81.26 m
1989: 84.84 m
1992: 82.26 m

References

External links

Living people
1964 births
Sportspeople from Magdeburg
East German male javelin throwers
German male javelin throwers
Olympic athletes of Germany
Athletes (track and field) at the 1992 Summer Olympics
Doping cases in athletics
East German sportspeople in doping cases
Universiade medalists in athletics (track and field)
Universiade bronze medalists for East Germany
Medalists at the 1987 Summer Universiade